The Vietnamese famine of 1945 ( – famine of the Yiyou Year or Nạn đói năm '45 – the 1945 famine) was a famine that occurred in northern Vietnam in French Indochina during World War II from October 1944 to late 1945, which at the time was under Japanese occupation from  1940 with Vichy France as an ally of Nazi Germany in Western Europe. Between 400,000 and 2 million people are estimated to have starved to death during this time.

According to a 2018 study, the primary cause of the famine were typhoons that reduced the availability of food, Japan's occupation, American attacks on the Vietnamese transport system, and French colonial administration hindering an effective famine alleviation response.

Causes

The famine had many causes. The direct cause was the effects of World War II on French Indochina. The involvement of France and Japan in Vietnam caused detrimental effects to the economic activities of the Vietnamese. In 1944, after US bombing cut off supplies of coal from the north to Saigon, the French and Japanese used rice and maize as fuel for power stations. According to diplomat Bui Minh Dung, "the Japanese occupation of Vietnam was the direct cause, in the final analysis, of several other factors, in turn affecting the famine, but their military efforts together with their economic policy for the Greater East Asia Co-Prosperity Sphere per se seem to have systematically played a role considerably greater than any other factors in the Vietnamese starvation."

The mismanagement of the French administration in Vietnam was the indirect cause. The French reformed the economy to serve the administration and to meet the needs of war - including the Japanese occupation. They imposed a compulsory system of government rice purchases with a price ceiling of 1.40 Piastres for every 10 kilograms, which they continued paying even as the market rates soared: from 2.50 to 3 piastres in 1943 to 6-7 in June 1944, it ballooned tenfold to 60-70 piastres the following year. This meant farmers could no longer afford to repurchase rice needed for new harvests, nor feed themselves. 

Natural causes included natural disasters such as droughts and floods, which destroyed northern crops.

The crop failures of 1943–45 were compounded by lack of dike maintenance following US bombing of the north and the catastrophic rainfall of August–September 1944, causing flooding and loss of rice plants.

French colonial administration
After the Great Depression in the 1930s, France returned to its policy of economic protectorate and monopolized the exploitation of natural resources of French Indochina. The people in French Indochina had to increase the economic value of the area by growing cash crops in place of lower-value agricultural produce, but only the French, a small minority of Vietnamese and Hoa and some people in the cities benefited.

A similar poor harvest as in the famine had happened in 1937, but the administration had managed to counter it by preparing food reserves and a series of public works projects for poor farmers, akin to the American New Deal.

World War II 
 

When the war started, France was weakened. In East Asia, Japan began to expand and viewed French Indochina as a bridge into Southeast Asia and a means to isolate and further weaken the Nationalist government of China. In mid-1940, Metropolitan France was occupied by Nazi Germany and Japan increased pressure on France and entered French Indochina that September. Vietnam was pulled into a wartime economy, with France and Japan competing in administration. Japanese troops forced farmers to grow jute, instead of rice, thus depriving them of needed food, but France had already started the same policy to a smaller degree. The land set aside for growing staple crops such as maize and potatoes was decreased to make land for growing cotton, jute, and other industrial plants. Because of the decreased land available for growing, harvests of staple crops decreased considerably. Crops were also exported to Japan.

The militaries of both France and Japan forcibly seized food from farmers to feed their troops. By 1941, there were 140,000 Japanese troops in French Indochina in addition to the Vichy French forces. During the occupation the Allies made frequent air strikes against roads, warehouse and transportation facilities, which made the transport of rice from the south to the north extremely difficult. In the meantime, the puppet Vichy French civilian administration was dysfunctional and unable to distribute remaining food stocks to areas where needed. In March 1945, the Japanese ousted the Vichy administration and replaced it with the Japanese-sponsored Empire of Vietnam, headed by Trần Trọng Kim. While this new government increased efforts to alleviate the famine, the inadequate food supply and the hoarding of food by the Imperial Japanese Army made their efforts futile.

Natural disasters
In northern Vietnam, drought and pests caused the winter-spring harvest of 1944 to decrease by 20%. Then, a flood during the harvest season caused the crisis to occur, which led to famine in 1945.

Consequences 

By early 1945, many were forced to walk from town to town in search of food. The exact number of deaths caused by the 1944–1945 famine is unknown and is a matter of controversy. Various sources estimate between 400,000 and 2 million people starved in northern Vietnam during this time. In May 1945, the envoy at Hanoi asked the northern provinces to report their casualties. Twenty provinces reported that a total of 380,000 people starved to death and 20,000 more died because of disease. In October, a report from a French military official estimated half a million deaths. Governor General Jean Decoux wrote in his memoirs A la barre de l'Indochine that about 1 million northerners had starved to death.

The Viet Minh successfully directed public resentment and encouraged the peasants to seize the rice granaries of the occupation powers. In response, the Japanese imposed harsh punishment upon the transgressors and sometimes even mutilate them physically. That further inflamed popular anger. In the process, the Viet Minh transformed itself from a guerilla organization into a mass movement. Ho Chi Minh, in his Proclamation of Independence of the Democratic Republic of Vietnam on 2 September 1945, would refer to the famine and quote a figure of 2 million deaths. Modern Vietnamese historians estimate between 1 and 2 million deaths.

According to the Việt Minh, 1 to 2 million Vietnamese starved to death in the Red River Delta of northern Vietnam because of the Japanese since they seized Vietnamese rice and failed to pay. In Phat Diem the Vietnamese farmer Di Ho was one of the few survivors who saw the Japanese steal grain. The North Vietnamese government accused both France and Japan of the famine and said that 1–2 million Vietnamese died. Võ An Ninh took photographs of dead and dying Vietnamese during the great famine. Starving Vietnamese were dying throughout northern Vietnam in 1945 from the Japanese seizure of their crops when the Chinese came to disarm the Japanese, and Vietnamese corpses were all throughout the streets of Hanoi and had to be cleaned up by students.

See also
Holodomor
Vietnam in World War II

References

Further reading

External links
Vietnam famine's living legacy
Images of the famine (in Vietnamese)
Famine fed farmers' fight for freedom

Famines in Asia
History of Vietnam (1945–present)
Military history of Vietnam during World War II
Health disasters in Vietnam
1944 in Vietnam
1945 in Vietnam
20th century in Vietnam
20th-century famines